Carinaria pseudorugosa is a species of sea gastropod, a holoplanktonic marine gastropod mollusk in the family Carinariidae.

Distribution
This marine species occurs in the Atlantic Ocean, on the Mid Atlantic Ridge west of the Azores

Description 
The maximum recorded shell length is 40 mm.

Habitat 
Minimum recorded depth is 0 m. Maximum recorded depth is 150 m.

References

 Vayssière A. (1904). Mollusque hétéropodes provenant des campagnes des yachts Hirondelle et Princesse Alice. Résultats des campagnes scientifiques accomplies sur son yacht par Albert 1er, Prince souverain de Monaco 26: 3-65 pl. 1-6 page(s): 20–22; pl. 6 fig. 82-85

External links
  Pafort-van Iersel, T. (1983). Distribution and variation of Carinariidae and Pterotracheidae (Heteropoda, Gastropoda) of the Amsterdam Mid North Atlantic Plankton Expedition 1980. Beaufortia. 33: 73-96

Carinariidae
Gastropods described in 1904